Prosthecomicrobium hirschii is a bacterium from the genus of Prosthecomicrobium with a polar or subpolar flagella. Prosthecomicrobium hirschii has been isolated from a muskrat pond in North Carolina in the United States.

References

Further reading 
 
 

Hyphomicrobiales
Bacteria described in 1984